Prolita puertella is a moth of the family Gelechiidae. It was described by August Busck in 1916. It is found in North America, where it has been recorded from Montana, California and Arizona. It has also been reported from Baja California.

The wingspan is 16–20 mm. The forewings are usually pale yellowish white with brown markings. The hindwings are pale fuscous yellow. However, it is a highly variable species, ranging from pale yellowish-white specimens with two prominent dark brown spots on the forewings to brown specimens with the dark brown spots barely discernible. Adults are on wing from August to October.

Etymology
The species name refers to La Puerta, the type location.

References

Moths described in 1916
Prolita